Hyacinth Hazel O'Higgins (4 October 1919 – 10 May 1970), stage name Hy Hazell, was a British actress of theatre, musicals and revue as well as a contralto singer and film actress. AllMusic described her as "an exuberant comic actor and lively singer and dancer". A pretty brunette,  with long legs, she was billed as Britain's answer to  Betty Grable.

Career
Hazell was born in Streatham in South London on 4 October 1919. As a teenager, she started life as a performer in the chorus of the West End production of Rodgers and Hart's On Your Toes (1937). She later had a long and successful run of leading roles in musicals, including Expresso Bongo at the Saville Theatre in 1958, as heartless Dixie Collins; as Mrs Squeezum in the Mermaid Theatre's Lock Up Your Daughters in 1959 (playing for almost 2,000 performances); as ex-Cochran girl Kay Connor in Charlie Girl at the Adelphi Theatre from 1965 ; and as Mrs Peachum in a notable Beggar's Opera by the Prospect Theatre Company in 1968.

Her appearances also include:

 A Talent to Amuse; 1969 – 1970, Phoenix Theatre, London.
 Miss Miniver, Ann Veronica; 17th April – May 1969, Cambridge Theatre, London.
 The Beggar’s Opera; 1968 – 1969, Apollo Theatre (Shaftesbury Avenue), London.
 The Confederacy; 19th – 24th October 1964, Cambridge Arts Theatre.
 Mollie Plummer, No Strings; 30th December 1963 – March 1964, Her / His Majesty’s Theatre, London.
 Dixie Collins, Expresso Bongo; started 31st March 1958, Alexandra Theatre, Birmingham and Saville Theatre, London.
 Esmeralda Leigh, Dead On Nine; started 24th August 1955, Westminster Theatre, London.
 Anne Etherton, Ten Men And A Miss; 18th June – 13th October 1951, Aldwych Theatre, London and Opera House, Manchester.

Films
Hazell was in British films Meet Me at Dawn (1946), The Yellow Balloon (1953), and B-movies like The Body Said No! and  The Lady Craved Excitement (both 1950), the latter part allowing her to sing. Within the British tradition of having glamorous young women play the principal boy in pantos, she became a favourite. She established a reputation as "English pantomime's most distinguished post war principal boy". For years she was extremely popular in this seasonal form of theatre.

Personal life
Hazell's given named of Hyacinth was abbreviated to "Hy" by Nigel Patrick when they were in Italy during World War II entertaining troops.

She married Edward Adam Primrose Jenkins, land agent to the Duke of Marlborough, in 1950; he died in June 1960 at age 50.

In the summer of 1969, Hazell began playing Golde in Fiddler on the Roof in London's West End. On 10 May 1970, a Sunday when there was no performance, she died accidentally by choking to death whilst eating a steak at a friend's house. An inquest found that her blood showed a very high alcohol level: "A high enough level to account for some carelessness about eating and possibly the swallowing of food and therefore to have been almost a certain reason for her choking."

Selected filmography

 The Dummy Talks (1943) (credited as Derna Hazell)
 Meet Me at Dawn (1947)
 Just William's Luck (1947)
 Paper Orchid (1949)
 Celia (1949)
 The Lady Craved Excitement (1950)
 The Body Said No! (1950)
 The Franchise Affair (1951)
 The Night Won't Talk (1952)
 The Yellow Balloon (1953)
 Forces' Sweetheart (1953)
 Stolen Assignment (1955)
 Up in the World (1956)
 The Mail Van Murder (Scotland Yard film series) (1957)
 The Key Man (1957)
 The Whole Truth (1958)
 Trouble with Eve (1960)
 Five Golden Hours (1961)
 What Every Woman Wants (1962)
 Every Home Should Have One (1970)

Notes

References

External links

1919 births
1970 deaths
20th-century English actresses
20th-century English singers
Actresses from London
English people of Irish descent
English film actresses
English musical theatre actresses
English stage actresses
Deaths from choking
People from Streatham
20th-century English women singers